Spafford Forest is an Onondaga County preserve that provides trails for hiking and dirt biking. It is close to Ripley Hill.

 Onondaga County Parks
 Spafford Forest Recreation Committee

Protected areas of Onondaga County, New York